Dying to Live is the third studio album by American Christian hip hop artist Derek Minor (who at the time went by the name PRo), released on August 23, 2011 through RMG and Reach Records a part of his joint venture two-album deal with Reach.

Track listing

References

Derek Minor albums
2011 albums
Reach Records albums